Jennifer Widerstrom (born August 24, 1982) is an American fitness model and personal trainer. She appears as a trainer on the American version of the television series The Biggest Loser, replacing Jillian Michaels. She also appeared on American Gladiators, as the female gladiator Phoenix, in 2008 for its second season.

She also appeared in the 2015 documentary titled Why Am I So Fat?

Personal life 
Widerstrom was born in Downers Grove, Illinois.

References

Living people
American exercise instructors
1982 births
American people of Swedish descent